Viv is an intelligent personal assistant software created by the developers of Siri. It debuted on May 9, 2016, at TechCrunch Disrupt New York. Compared to Siri, the software's platform is open and can accommodate external plug-ins written to work with the assistant. It can also handle more complex queries. The development team has been working on the software since 2012 and had raised over $22 million in funding by early 2015 and $30 million by early 2016.

On October 5, 2016, the software and its developer, Viv Labs, Inc. (formerly Six Five Labs, Inc.) was acquired by Samsung Electronics.

The following month, it was revealed that a personal assistant software would be available on the Samsung Galaxy S8 and S8+. This, however, turned out to be Bixby, which was a relaunch of S Voice, rather than based on Viv. In October 2017, Samsung announced Viv Labs technology would be integrated into Bixby 2.0.

Patents

See also 
 Amazon Alexa
 Bixby (virtual assistant)
 Cortana (software)
 Google Assistant
 Mycroft
 Siri
 Clova (virtual assistant)

References

External links 
 

2016 software
Samsung software
Samsung Electronics
Virtual assistants